4031 Mueller, provisional designation , is a Hungaria asteroid from the inner regions of the asteroid belt, approximately 4 kilometers in diameter. It was discovered on 12 February 1985, by American astronomer Carolyn Shoemaker at Palomar Observatory, California, and named after astronomer Jean Mueller.

Orbit and classification 

Mueller is a member of the Hungaria family, which form the innermost dense concentration of asteroids in the Solar System. It orbits the Sun in the inner main-belt at a distance of 1.7–2.1 AU once every 2 years and 8 months (983 days). Its orbit has an eccentricity of 0.10 and an inclination of 19° with respect to the ecliptic.

Physical characteristics 

Muellers spectral type is that of an E-type asteroid, typical for members of the Hungaria family. It has also been characterized as an X-type asteroid by PanSTARRS photometric survey.

Rotation period 

Four rotational lightcurves for this asteroid were obtained from photometric observations made by American astronomer Brian Warner at his Palmer Divide Observatory between 2008 and 2016. They all gave a concurring, well-defined rotation period of 2.942 to 2.944 hours with a brightness variation between 0.14 and 0.19 magnitude.

Diameter and albedo 

According to the survey carried out by NASA's Wide-field Infrared Survey Explorer with its subsequent NEOWISE mission, the asteroid measures 3.9 kilometers in diameter and its surface has a high albedo of 0.389, while the Collaborative Asteroid Lightcurve Link assumes an albedo of 0.30 and calculates a diameter of 5.56 kilometers with an absolute magnitude of 13.2.

Naming 

This minor planet was named after American astronomer Jean Mueller (b. 1950), discoverer of minor planets, comets and supernovae during the course of the Second Palomar Observatory Sky Survey (POSS II) using the Oschin Telescope at Palomar Observatory in the late 1980s and early 1990s. The official naming citation was published by the Minor Planet Center on 12 December 1989.

Notes

References

External links 
  
 The Second Palomar Sky Survey, 1993
 Asteroid Lightcurve Database (LCDB), query form (info )
 Dictionary of Minor Planet Names, Google books
 Asteroids and comets rotation curves, CdR – Observatoire de Genève, Raoul Behrend
 Discovery Circumstances: Numbered Minor Planets (1)-(5000) – Minor Planet Center
 
 

004031
Discoveries by Carolyn S. Shoemaker
Named minor planets
19850212